i12 Katong (formerly Katong Mall and Katong People's Complex) is a seven-storey shopping mall in the east of Singapore. It is located at the intersection of East Coast Road and Joo Chiat Road. The mall was closed for renovations since March 2020 and had its soft reopening on 23 December 2021, and its grand reopening on 23 June 2022.

History
Completed in late 1983 as Katong People's Complex, it had an exterior facade resembling a prison cell, such as having exposed blue pipes. It was a strata titled mall back then, comprising a department store and various shops and eateries. There are also numerous medical clinics inside the mall.

In 1995, the facade was revamped and the mall was renamed Katong Mall. The department store was replaced by Cold Storage supermarket, and various education centres occupied the upper floors of the mall. The mall's basements contained an electronics store and various strata titled units.

In 2009, because of bad business, Pua Seck Guan, former chief executive of CapitaLand Retail, bought Katong Mall in a $247.55 million deal as part of an en bloc sale. A private trust called Perennial Katong Retail Trust was subsequently formed to buy the mall from Tuan Sing Holdings' Golden Cape Investment. The trust's investors included corporate and institutional investors and Pua.

The mall closed its doors in mid 2010 for a major makeover, to help revitalize the mall. When it reopened as I12 Katong in late 2011, it featured a Peranakan theme, as a reminder of its location. The mall also featured a Golden Village cinema, a Food Republic food court, a gourmet supermarket by Cold Storage, banks and more than 150 specialty shops. It also featured a wet and dry playground on the fourth floor.

In early 2016, Keppel Land acquired a 22.4% stake in the mall from the owners at $51.4 million. In May 2016, plans were announced to redevelop the play deck on the fourth floor into an alfresco dining area. There are plans for a non-profit organisation to take up space in the mall too.

In December 2018, Keppel Land acquired the remaining 77.6% stake of the mall from the subsidiary of Alpha Asia Macro Trends Fund at the price of $56.6m.

The mall was closed since March 2020 for extensive revitalization works and was reopened on 23 December 2021, in order to "capture the charm and character of Katong". In April 2021, it was announced that the mall is currently 50% tenanted, with returning anchors CS Fresh, Golden Village, United World Preschool and Wine Connection. New tenants include Climb Asia, Guzman Y Gomez, Kindermusik With Love Studios, Malaysia Boleh, PS Café, Signature KOI, We are Sultans and Scoop Wholefoods, along with 180 new speciality shops. The atrium will also be relocated to Level 1, and it will have three zones, Fashion Lifestyle, Home and Living and Family Entertainment, which will be shared later this year. The Peranakan theme will be done away as well, coupled with its rebranding to reflect current trends.

The mall officially re-opened on 23 June 2022. Some of the new tenants include Bistro Bytes, where customers could pick up their food and beverage orders from fully automated lockers; and Core Clinic, a medical co-working space with clinic spaces and medical facilities. The mall also has new features including electric vehicle chargers, urban farm areas, and a food digestor to break down food waste from F&B outlets.

References

External links
 

2011 establishments in Singapore
Shopping malls in Singapore
Shopping malls established in 2011